Live – The Way We Walk, Volume Two: The Longs is the fifth live album by British band Genesis and was released in 1993, having been recorded during their 1992 tour for We Can't Dance. The album's title refers to a lyric in two songs, "I Can't Dance" on the previous volume and "I Know What I Like" on this one.

While its companion piece, the preceding The Way We Walk, Volume One: The Shorts contained the band's recent pop hits, The Way We Walk, Volume Two: The Longs focused on the longer songs performed during this period. For the 1992 tour, Genesis performed a "new" medley of their old songs—"Dance on a Volcano/The Lamb Lies Down on Broadway/The Musical Box/Firth of Fifth/I Know What I Like (In Your Wardrobe)"—which replaced the "In the Cage" medley. The "Old Medley" appeared on both this album and (in a very slightly different version) on the DVD of the Earls Court concert.  The DVD version of "Old Medley" contains a very small snippet of "Misunderstanding" in place of the CD version's brief snippet of "Your Own Special Way".

The Way We Walk, Volume Two: The Longs reached No.1 in the UK where it remained in the charts for 9 weeks, and No.20 in the U.S. It remains the band's last No.1 album.

Track listing

Note: "Drum Duet" was not included on the vinyl release.

Personnel 
Genesis
 Phil Collins – lead vocals, drums, percussion
 Tony Banks – keyboards, backing vocals
 Mike Rutherford – guitars, bass, backing vocals

Additional musicians
 Daryl Stuermer – guitar, bass, backing vocals
 Chester Thompson –  drums, percussion

Charts

Weekly charts

Year-end charts

Certifications

References
Notes

Citations

Albums produced by Nick Davis (record producer)
Genesis (band) live albums
1993 live albums
Atlantic Records live albums
Virgin Records live albums